Reuben Thayaparan a/l Kathiripillai (born 2 April 1990) is a Malaysian professional footballer who plays for Malaysia Premier League club Sarawak United as a defender.

Personal life
K. Reuben grew up on the premise of an orphanage in Selangor, which was set up by his parents Rev. Terrence K. K. Sinnadurai and Mrs. Kamala Sinnadurai.

Career statistics

Club

International

Honours

Club
ATM
 Malaysia Premier League: 2012
 Malaysia Charity Shield: 2013

UKM
 IPT Football League: 2012 IPT Football League

References

External links
 
 Universiade 2011 Athlete Profile: REUBEN THAYAPARAN KATHIRIPILLAI

1990 births
Living people
Malaysian footballers
Malaysia international footballers
ATM FA players
PKNS F.C. players
Penang F.C. players
Sarawak United FC players
People from Selangor
Malaysian people of Tamil descent
Malaysian sportspeople of Indian descent
Malaysia Super League players
Association football defenders
Association football midfielders